Sławomir Cenckiewicz (born 20 July 1971) is a Polish historian and journalist.

Life
A former employee of the Institute of National Remembrance, since 2016 Cenckiewicz is president of the Polish Army's History Office.

He gained much media attention following the 2008 publication of a book he co-authored with Piotr Gontarczyk, SB a Lech Wałęsa. Przyczynek do biografii (The SB and Lech Wałęsa: Contribution to a Biography), about Lech Wałęsa's service as an informant of the communist Służba Bezpieczeństwa. Gontarczyk and Cenckiewicz argued that in the 1970s the Solidarity (Polish trade union) leader and former President of Poland Lech Wałęsa was a secret informant for the Polish communist secret police, the Służba Bezpieczeństwa (SB).

Cenckiewicz is a graduate of the Gdańsk University History Department. His main fields of expertise are the modern history of Poland, including the opposition in the Polish People's Republic and the Polish diaspora. He was habilitated as a doctor of history at the Cardinal Stefan Wyszyński University in Warsaw.

Cenckiewicz has worked with the London-based Polonia Aid Foundation Trust (2000 and 2004), Kościuszko Foundation (2000), and the Chicago-based Foundation for Free Speech (2005).

Cenckiewicz opposes a renewed Jedwabne exhumation.

Cenckiewicz identifies as a follower of Traditionalist Catholicism and has criticized Pope Francis and his positions for what Cenckiewicz says has hastened secularization in Catholic countries.

Books authored 
 Oczami bezpieki: szkice i materiały z dziejów aparatu bezpieczeństwa PRL, Kraków: Wyd. Arcana, 2005, 
 Tadeusz Katelbach (1897-1977): biografia polityczna, Wydawnictwo LTW, Warszawa 2005,  =doctoral dissertation=
 SB a Lech Wałęsa. Przyczynek do biografii, Warszawa 2008,  [co-authored with Piotr Gontarczyk ].
 Sprawa Lecha Wałęsy, Poznań: Zysk i s-ka, 2008, .
 Śladami bezpieki i partii. Rozprawy - Źródła - Publicystyka, Wydawnictwo LTW, Łomianki, 2009. 
 Gdański Grudzień '70, Wydawnictwo IPN, Gdańsk-Warszawa 2009., 
 Anna Solidarność. Życie i działalność Anny Walentynowicz na tle epoki (1929-2010), Zysk i S-ka, 2010. 
 Długie ramię Moskwy. Wywiad wojskowy Polski Ludowej 1943-1991 (wprowadzenie do syntezy), Zysk i S-ka, 2011.  
 Lech Kaczyński. Biografia polityczna 1949–2005, Zysk i S-ka, 2013,  (other authors: Anna Piekarska, Adam Chmielecki, Janusz Kowalski)
 Wałęsa. Człowiek z teczki, Zysk i S-ka, 2013, 
 Atomowy szpieg. Ryszard Kukliński i wojna wywiadów, Wydawnictwo Zysk i S-ka, Poznań 2014

References

External links 
 http://www.slawomircenckiewicz.pl

1971 births
Living people
Controversies in Poland
21st-century Polish historians
Polish male non-fiction writers
People associated with the Institute of National Remembrance
University of Gdańsk alumni
Polish traditionalist Catholics
Academic staff of Nicolaus Copernicus University in Toruń